Adriano Eli Corrêa (born 13 January 1976) more commonly known as Eli Corrêa Filho is a Brazilian politician and radio personality. He has spent his political career representing São Paulo, having served as federal deputy representative since 2011.

Personal life
Corrêa is the son of Antônio Eli Corrêa, better known as Eli Corrêa, a famed radio personality from Paraná, and Ana Maria Pacolo, a psychologist and lawyer. He is married Francislene Assis de Almeida Corrêa and has two daughter: Sophia e Luna. Corrêa himself has worked as a radio personality himself for several decades in his home city of São Paulo.

Political career
Corrêa voted in favor of the impeachment against then-president Dilma Rousseff and political reformation. He would later vote in against opening a corruption investigation against Rousseff's successor Michel Temer, and voted in favor of the 2017 Brazilian labor reforms.

References

1976 births
Living people
People from São Paulo
Brazilian radio personalities
Democrats (Brazil) politicians
Brazil Union politicians
Members of the Chamber of Deputies (Brazil) from São Paulo
Members of the Legislative Assembly of São Paulo